Bryan G. (foaled 1947 in Virginia) was a successful American Thoroughbred racehorse and sire of the great Hall of Fame Champion racemare, Cicada.

Bryan G. was bred by Christopher Chenery at his Meadow Stud in Doswell, Virginia. Raced by Chenery, he was trained by Casey Hayes. Among his most important race wins, Bryan G. won the 1951 Pimlico Special, at the time a prestigious winner-take-all event that became the first ever race to be televised nationally.

Sire of champions Cicada and Sayil who was horse of the year in Mexico

References

1947 racehorse births
Racehorses bred in Virginia
Racehorses trained in the United States
Thoroughbred family 2-n